The Papyrus Fouad 266 (three fragments listed as Rahlfs 847, 848 and 942) are fragments, part of a papyrus manuscript in scroll form containing the Greek translation, known as the Septuagint, of the Pentateuch. They have been assigned palaeographically to the 1st century BCE. There is discussion about whether the text is original or a later recension of the Septuagint.

Description 
The Greek text was written on papyrus in uncial letters. The text is written in 33 lines per column. The uncial letters are upright and rounded. Iota adscript occurs. It is designated by number 847, 848, and 942, on the list of Septuagint manuscripts according to the modern numbering of Alfred Rahlfs. It contains section divisions with numbered paragraphs (5, 26, 27). 117 papyrus fragments of the codex have survived. This is "clearly a Jewish manuscript".

The prefix Fouad commemorates Fouad I of Egypt.

Version 
The text of the manuscript runs close to the Old Greek text of Septuagint, but according to Albert Pietersma it is an early recension towards the Masoretic Text (i.e., Deuteronomy 22:9). Disagreeing with Pietersma, George Dunbar Kilpatrick and Emanuel Tov "see no recension at work."

Tetragrammaton 
This papyrus, found in Egypt, is dated to the first century BC and is the second oldest known manuscript of the Septuagint (Greek version of the Hebrew Bible). It is the oldest manuscript that, in the midst of the Greek text, uses the Hebrew Tetragrammaton in Aramaic "square" or Ashuri script, . Some have argued that originally the Greek text rendered the divine name YHWH not by κύριος but by the Tetragrammaton, others that the text in this manuscript is the result of a Hebraizing revision of the original Greek text, which had κύριος.

Albert Pietersma was the first to claim that Fouad contains some pre-hexaplaric corrections towards a Hebrew text (which would have had the Tetragrammaton). Pietersma also states that there is room for the reading  (The Lord) but the second scribe inserted the Tetragrammaton instead. The space left by the first scribe is in fact exactly that required for six letters (as in the word ΚΥΡΙΟΣ), which Michael Thomas interprets as indicating that the older manuscript that the scribe was copying did have ΚΥΡΙΟΣ. Koenen has argued in his notes to the new edition of P. Fouad 266 "that the scribe of 848 was unable to write the Hebrew tetragram and hence left space for a second scribe to insert it", probably because "requiring greater sanctity". Emanuel Tov notes: "the original Greek scribe left open large spaces for Tetragrammaton indicated by a raised dot on each side of the space". Würthwein also judges that "the tetragrammaton appears to have been an archaizing and hebraizing revision of the earlier translation κύριος".

History of the scroll 
Palaeographically the manuscript has been assigned to the 1st or even 2nd century BC. It is the second oldest manuscript of the Septuagint. It was discovered in 1939 in Fayyum, where there were two Jewish synagogues. The first published text from the manuscript was edited by William Gillan Waddell in 1944. 18 further fragments of the manuscript were published in 1950 in the New World Translation of the Christian Greek Scriptures. It was examined by Françoise Dunand and P. E. Kahle. In 1971 were published all 117 fragments of the manuscript. The manuscript currently is housed at the Société Royale de Papyrologie, Cairo.

See also 
 Papyrus Rylands 458 – the oldest manuscript of Septuagint
 Biblical manuscript

References

Sources

External links 
 The Alexandrian Septuagint History, Barry Setterfield (2010)

1st-century BC biblical manuscripts
Septuagint manuscripts